Norway competed at the 1984 Winter Olympics in Sarajevo, Yugoslavia.

Medalists

Alpine skiing

Men

Biathlon

Men

Men's 4 x 7.5 km relay

 1 A penalty loop of 150 metres had to be skied per missed target.
 2 One minute added per missed target.

Cross-country skiing

Men

Men's 4 × 10 km relay

Women

Women's 4 × 5 km relay

Ice hockey

Group B
Top two teams (shaded ones) advanced to the medal round.

Czechoslovakia 10-4 Norway
Finland 16-2 Norway
Norway 3-3 USA
Canada 8-1 Norway
Austria 6-5 Norway
Team roster
Trond Abrahamsen
Cato Hamre Andersen
Arne Bergseng
Åge Ellingsen
Stephen Foyn
Jørn Goldstein
Øystein Jarlsbo
Roy Johansen
Jon-Magne Karlstad
Erik Kristiansen
Per-Arne Kristiansen
Øivind Løsåmoen
Ørjan Løvdal
Sven Lien
Jim Marthinsen
Geir Myhre
Erik Nerell
Bjørn Skaare
Petter Thoresen
Frank Vestreng
Head coach: Hans Westberg

Luge

Men

Women

Nordic combined 

Events:
 normal hill ski jumping 
 15 km cross-country skiing

Ski jumping

Speed skating

Men

Women

References
 Official Olympic Reports
 International Olympic Committee results database
 Olympic Winter Games 1984, full results by sports-reference.com

Nations at the 1984 Winter Olympics
1984
Winter Olympics